De Avonturen van Pa Pinkelman (The Adventures of Pa Pinkelman) was a Dutch text comic, written by Dutch novelist Godfried Bomans and illustrated by Carol Voges. It was published in the Dutch newspaper De Volkskrant between 1945 and 1952. The stories can be described as an absurd fantasy strip, originally intended for children, but gradually drawing in a more adult audience as well, due to references to then actual political events.

History

After the Netherlands were freed from German occupation in 1945 Godfried Bomans became chief of the cultural department of De Volkskrant.  Together with illustrator Carol Voges he made a newspaper comic strip about an old man with magical powers, Pa Pinkelman ("Father Pinkelman") and his jolly wife Tante Pollewop ("Aunt Pollewop"). They help a young boy, Kareltje Flens, who lives a rich and spoiled life, to get away from his luxury life and have some exotic adventures in the Zuiderzee, Urk, Schokland, Africa, the North Pole, the Sahara Desert, the United States of America and the Moon (later stories also bring them to Tibet, China and Japan). Pinkelman, Pollewop, Kareltje and his little black slave, Flop, travel together in all kinds of ways, but are constantly followed by three of  Kareltje's servants who try to bring him back.

The stories have an absurd atmosphere, complete with jokes that break the fourth wall. In some episodes Pinkelman also meets famous politicians of the late 1940s and early 1950s, such as Winston Churchill, Mohammad Mosaddegh, the Shah of Persia, Carl Romme,  Joseph Stalin, Harry S. Truman, Dwight Eisenhower and Vyacheslav Molotov. Other stories make allusions on post-war situations, such as the collaboration and the atomic bomb. Bomans himself also made appearances in the strip.

The story was an immediate success, and Bomans was asked to write more sequels. After three more installments the series finally came to a close in 1952, because the author felt it took up too much of his time.

Pa Pinkelman has been made available in novel format, with only a few of the images used as illustrations. Complete versions of the entire comic strip are also available.

Adaptations

In 1964 the NCRV adapted the story as a black-and-white children's TV series. It had 20 episodes and was a rudimentary animated series based on Voges' original drawings, while Kitty Janssen and Wim de Haas provided voices.

Between October 25, 1976 and March 14, 1977 the KRO made another TV adaptation. This was a live-action series starring Ton van Duinhoven and Maya Bouma as Pinkelman and Pollewop.

Legacy

Belgian comics artist Dirk Stallaert has expressed admiration for the stories of Pa Pinkelman.

Sources

External links
 A list of the various book publications

Dutch comic strips
1945 comics debuts
1952 comics endings
Humor comics
Fantasy comics
Adventure comics
Satirical comics
Text comics
Comics about magic
Surreal comedy
Comics set in Africa
Comics set in the Netherlands
Comics set in China
Comics set in Japan
Comics set in Tibet
Comics set in the United States
Arctic in fiction
Western Sahara in fiction
Comics set on the Moon
Comics adapted into novels
Comics adapted into television series
Comics set in the 1940s
Comics set in the 1950s
Novels by Godfried Bomans
Male characters in comics
Fictional Dutch people
Dutch political satire